The 2017 Karnataka State Film Awards, presented by Government of Karnataka, felicitated the best of Karnataka cinema released in the year 2017. The list of winners were announced on 25 October 2018. The jury panel headed by director N. S. Shankar submitted the list of winners to the Chief Minister H. D. Kumaraswamy.

Lifetime achievement award

Jury 
A committee headed by director Kavitha Lankesh was appointed to evaluate the awards. Other jury members were actress Rekha Rao, cinematographer Basavaraj, Director KN Vaidyanath and singer Chandrika Gururaj.

Film Awards

Other Awards

References

2017
2017 Indian film awards